Szentlőrinckáta is a village in Pest county, Hungary.The mayor is currently Viola Szabó.

References

Populated places in Pest County